Zhejiang Expressway Company Limited is an infrastructure company engaged in investing, developing and operating expressways in Zhejiang Province, China. It also carries out other related businesses such as automobile servicing, gas station operation and billboard advertising along expressways.

External links
Zjec.com.cn

Companies listed on the Hong Kong Stock Exchange
Construction and civil engineering companies of China
Government-owned companies of China
Companies based in Hangzhou
Construction and civil engineering companies established in 1997
Transport companies established in 1997
H shares
China Merchants
Chinese companies established in 1997